The following lists events that happened during 2006 in Zimbabwe.

Incumbents
 President: Robert Mugabe 
 Prime Minister: Morgan Tsvangirai 
 First Vice President: Joice Mujuru
 Second Vice President: Joseph Msika

Events

September
 September 7

References

 
Years of the 21st century in Zimbabwe
2000s in Zimbabwe
Zimbabwe
Zimbabwe